, there were about 24,500 electric vehicles in Ohio.

Government policy
, the state government charges a $200 annual registration fee for electric vehicles.

Charging stations
, there were around 900 public charging stations in Ohio.

The Infrastructure Investment and Jobs Act, signed into law in November 2021, allocates  to charging stations in Ohio.

Manufacturing
Ohio was historically a manufacturing hub for gasoline-powered cars, which has led many electric vehicle manufacturers to establish manufacturing hubs in the state.

By region

Akron
, there were 22 public charging stations in Akron.

Cincinnati
, the Cincinnati municipal government has stopped purchasing new gasoline-powered vehicles for the municipal fleet.

Cleveland
, there were five public charging stations in Shaker Heights, the highest per-capita number in the Cleveland metropolitan area.

Columbus
, 2% of all new vehicles sold in the Columbus metropolitan area were electric.

Dayton
The first electric vehicles in the Dayton city fleet were introduced in December 2022.

References

Ohio
Road transportation in Ohio